Eldora Lorenzini (1910–1993) was an American painter, known for her New Deal mural in the Hebron, Nebraska Post Office. She also worked for the Index of American Design.

Biography
Lorenzini was born in 1910 in Weldona, Colorado. She attended the Colorado Springs Fine Arts Center. Lorenzini was made aware of the Treasury Relief Art Project (TRAP) by one of her teachers, George Biddle. She subsequently submitted her entry for a mural and was selected for the US Post Office-Hebron. Her oil on canvas mural entitled Stampeding Buffaloes Stopping Train was completed in 1939. She was paid $670.00 for her work.

Lorenzini never married. She worked as an art teacher, illustrator, muralist and portrait painter. She died in Alliance, Nebraska in 1993.

Her work for the Index of American Design is in the collection of the National Gallery of Art in Washington, D.C..

References

1910 births
1993 deaths
American women painters
20th-century American painters
American muralists
20th-century American women artists
Women muralists
Section of Painting and Sculpture artists
Federal Art Project artists
People from Morgan County, Colorado
Painters from Colorado